James Henry Salisbury, M.D. (October 13, 1823 – August 23, 1905) was a 19th-century American physician, and the inventor of the Salisbury steak.

Early life
Salisbury was born in Scott, New York, in 1823. He earned a Bachelor of Natural Sciences degree from the Rensselaer Polytechnic Institute in 1844. He joined the New York Geological Survey as an assistant chemist, was promoted in 1849 to principal chemist, and remained in this position until 1852. He earned his medical degree from Albany Medical College in 1850, and a Master's degree from Union College in 1852.  He was elected a member of the American Antiquarian Society in 1862.

Career

Salisbury served as a physician during the American Civil War, and became convinced that diarrhea suffered by the troops could be controlled with a diet of coffee and lean chopped beefsteak.

Salisbury was one of the earliest health food faddists and taught that diet was the main determinant of health. He believed vegetables and starchy foods produced poisonous substances in the digestive system which were responsible for heart disease, tumors, mental illness and tuberculosis. He believed that human dentition demonstrated that humans were meant to eat meat, and sought to limit vegetables, fruit, starches, and fats to one-third of the diet.

The Salisbury steak, his means of achieving this goal, is ground beef flavored with onion and seasoning and then broiled and covered with gravy or brown sauce. It was introduced in 1888. Salisbury saw beef as an excellent defense against many different physical problems. He suggested that Salisbury steak should be eaten three times a day, with much hot water to cleanse the digestive system. He was an early American proponent of a low-carbohydrate diet for weight loss, and he promoted his diet for that purpose. His diet became known as the "Salisbury diet". It has been described as an early example of a fad diet. The Salisbury diet was promoted by Elma Stuart in her book What Must I do to Get Well?, that went through at least 32 editions.

Salisbury steak is similar to a number of other dishes made of ground beef. Its name caught on partly because World War I inspired a movement in English-speaking nations to avoid German-sounding terms such as "hamburger".

Death

Salisbury died aged 82 at his country home in Dobbs Ferry, New York and was buried at Lake View Cemetery in Cleveland, Ohio.

Publications

The Relation of Alimentation and Disease (1888)

References

Further reading

Morris Fishbein. (1951). Dr. James H. Salisbury, Salisbury steak or hamburger, and the Salisbury diet. Postgraduate Medical Journal 10 (3): 256-257.
Terence McLaughlin. (1978). A Diet of Tripe: The Chequered History of Food Reform. David & Charles. 
Elma Stuart. (1889). What Must I Do to Get Well?: And How Can I Keep So?: An Exposition of the Salisbury Treatment. W. A. Kellogg. 
The History of Salisbury Steak and Central New York. (2019). Exploring Upstate

External links

1823 births
1905 deaths
19th-century American physicians
Albany Medical College alumni
American Civil War surgeons
Burials at Lake View Cemetery, Cleveland
Low-carbohydrate diet advocates
Members of the American Antiquarian Society
People from Scott, New York
Rensselaer Polytechnic Institute alumni
Physicians from New York (state)